The Kyle of Sutherland is a river estuary that separates Sutherland from Ross-shire. It flows into the Dornoch Firth at Bonar Bridge, and is fed by the rivers Oykel, Shin, River Cassley and Carron.

The downstream extent of the Kyle of Sutherland is the eponymous bridge at Bonar Bridge. The upstream end of 'the Kyle' as it is locally known, is the furthest inland extent of tidal water, which corresponds to 'the bailey bridge', beyond Rosehall.

The Kyle did separate Sutherland and Ross-shire for centuries until 1975 when the old Scottish counties were abolished. The counties of Sutherland and Ross became districts of the Highland Region, with altered boundaries. As a result of this, the Kyle became wholly part of Sutherland, though most locals continue to refer to the original boundaries.

1892 flooding

The first Bonar Bridge was built in 1812 after the Battle of Culloden; it was engineered by Thomas Telford. Eighty years later, the bridge was swept away by a flood on 29 January 1892, a winter of many great floods in the North of Scotland. It has been suggested that this event was predicted by the Brahan Seer.

References

Rivers of Highland (council area)